The 2006 United States Senate election in New York was held on November 7, 2006. Incumbent Democratic U.S. Senator Hillary Clinton won re-election to a second term in office, by a more than two-to-one margin. Clinton was challenged by Republican John Spencer, the former Mayor of Yonkers. Longtime political activist Howie Hawkins of the Green Party also ran a third-party campaign. 

The election was not close, with Clinton winning 58 of New York's 62 counties. Clinton had a surprisingly strong performance in upstate New York which tends to be a tossup. Clinton's large margins in both upstate New York and in New York City helped propel her to a landslide victory over Spencer. Clinton was sworn in for what would be her last term in the senate serving from January 3, 2007 to January 21, 2009 when she assumed the office of United States Secretary of State in the Obama administration.

Democratic nomination

Campaign 
Hillary Clinton announced in November 2004 that she would seek a second term in the Senate, and began fundraising and campaigning.  Clinton faced opposition for the Democratic party nomination from the anti-war base of her own party, that had become increasingly frustrated with her support for the Iraq War.

On October 12, 2005 New Paltz firefighter and activist Steven Greenfield, a former Green Party leader, announced he would run as a Democrat.  On December 6, 2005, labor advocate Jonathan Tasini announced that he would run as well, running as an antiwar candidate, calling for immediate withdrawal of troops from Iraq, universal health care, expansion in Medicare benefits, the creation of Universal Voluntary Accounts for pensions, and what he termed "New Rules For the Economy", a more labor-centric as opposed to the corporate-centric approach to economic matters espoused by Clinton. Tasini was president of Economic Future Group and former president of the National Writers Union.  Tasini was supported by anti-war activist Cindy Sheehan, who had in October said of Clinton, "I will resist her candidacy with every bit of my power and strength...I will not make the mistake of supporting another pro-war Democrat for president again."

On March 31, 2006, businessman Mark Greenstein announced his run for the seat.  Greenstein, endorsed by the New Democrats, presented himself as a non-liberal Democrat who was campaigning to "bring the far left back to reality that Big Government is the source of most ongoing problems Democrat constituents face." He contended that Clinton was "too liberal" in her support for regulations, "too wishy-washy" on the Iraq war and on gay rights, and had lost integrity by using the Dubai Ports issue for political purposes.  Greenstein challenged Clinton to sign a pledge that she would serve out her full 6 year Senate term if re-elected.  However, in May 2006, Greenfield endorsed Tasini and essentially dropped out of the race.

On June 1, 2006, Clinton accepted the unanimous endorsement of the New York State Democratic Party's convention in Buffalo.  Eight days later, Greenstein dropped out of the race.  Tasini pressed on, submitting 40,000 signatures to the State Election Commission on July 14, far more than the 15,000 needed to force a primary. Clinton's campaign said that she would not challenge the signatures.

Results

Republican nomination

Campaign 
New York Republicans originally had high hopes of mounting a serious challenge to Clinton, and derailing her expected future presidential bid.  However, Clinton was politically strong in the state and no major Republican entered the race, with Governor George Pataki and early 2000 senate opponent Rudy Giuliani both declining to run.  The two most prominent Republicans contemplating a challenge to Clinton were lawyer Ed Cox (the son-in-law of former President Richard M. Nixon) and Westchester County District Attorney Jeanine Pirro.

Pirro was considered the front-runner, but her campaign had immediate difficulties.  During her August 10, 2005 live televised candidacy announcement in New York City, she paused for more than thirty seconds looking for a missing part of her speech, then asked, on the air, "Do I have page 10?"  Democrats re-aired the sequence as part of a Jeopardy! theme parody.  The Conservative Party of New York was also reluctant to embrace Pirro.  On August 18, 2005, another Republican candidate, former Mayor of Yonkers John Spencer, gave a radio interview in which he attacked Pirro, calling her chances of winning the Conservative Party of New York State nomination "a Chinaman's chance." Spencer later apologized.

On October 14, 2005, Governor Pataki endorsed Pirro. Later that day, Cox withdrew from the race; his campaign had raised only $114,249 in contributions in the prior three months.
On October 18, 2005, remarks by Pirro that appeared to suggest that Democrats were indifferent to child molesters and murderers drew sharp criticism from the Clinton campaign and others.

Pirro trailed Clinton badly in fund-raising and in polls; her campaign had failed to gain traction.  Under pressure from state party officials, she dropped out of the race on December 21, 2005, to run for New York State Attorney General instead, leaving the Republicans without a well-known candidate.  The announcement was timed to coincide with the 2005 New York City transit strike, so as to draw minimal attention to the Republicans' difficulties.  Pirro did not mention her campaign woes, but instead said, "I have concluded that my head and my heart remain in law enforcement, and that my public service should continue to be in that arena."

Declared Republican candidates now included Spencer and K. T. McFarland, who was a Deputy Assistant Secretary of Defense for Public Affairs under President Ronald Reagan. Cox considered reentering the race but did not.  Politically, Spencer was generally opposed to abortion, against gun control, and a supporter of tighter border security.  He supported the George W. Bush administration and its policies, including the war in Iraq.  Spencer came out in favor of New York's Court of Appeals denying same-sex marriage to 42 gay and lesbian couples who challenged that denial as unconstitutional. Spencer said that marriage equality for same-sex couples equated to "special rights for gays."  Spencer was endorsed by Republican officials such as Congressman Vito Fossella.  In contrast, McFarland was pro-choice.  However, McFarland ran into trouble with a March comment that appeared to allege that the Clinton campaign had been flying helicopters low over her Southampton, New York house and spying on her; she later said she had been joking, but the episode upset her.  In May, McFarland's campaign manager Ed Rollins made personal life charges against Spencer, to which the latter responded, "Shame on you."

On May 31, 2006, Spencer won the endorsement of the state Republican Party organization but did not achieve the threshold of 75 percent he needed to prevent McFarland from gaining an automatic position on the primary ballot.  He received 63 percent and would thus have to face McFarland in the September 12 Republican primary.  Spencer called on McFarland to step aside after the vote, but McFarland said she would not.  In a June 2006 radio ad, Spencer attacked national Republicans for not funding his campaign.  On August 22, McFarland announced that she would be suspending her campaign until further notice after her daughter was caught shoplifting.

Results 
On September 12, 2006, Spencer defeated McFarland in the Republican Primary, winning 61 to 39 percent of the vote.  Republican turnout was less than 6%, the lowest level in more than 30 years.  Spencer would also gain the Conservative Party line.

Results

Third party nominations

Green 
Howie Hawkins was the Green Party's candidate for the United States Senate in the state of New York.

His signature campaign issue was the Iraq War. Specifically, Hawkins criticized Senator Clinton's endorsement of the Iraq war resolution, and continued support for an American troop presence in Iraq.

Hawkins pledged to implement what he described as a modern-day version of the Hatfield–Kennedy Amendment (a proposed Senate resolution intended to cut off funding for the Vietnam War) which would defund military operations for the U.S. Armed Forces unless and until they were redeployed out of theater, and possibly replaced by an international peacekeeping force.

He called upon supporters of Tasini to vote for him in the general election.

Libertarian 
Jeff Russell was nominated as the official Libertarian Party candidate for United States Senate at the Libertarian Party of New York Convention on April 29, 2006, in Albany.

General election

Candidates

Major 
 Hillary Rodham Clinton (Democrat) - incumbent U.S. Senator from New York, serving since January 3, 2001. The wife of Bill Clinton, the 42nd President of the United States, she was First Lady of the United States during his two terms from 1993 to 2001. Before that, she was a lawyer and the First Lady of Arkansas. Clinton was also on the lines of the Independence Party of New York and the Working Families Party.  The Liberal Party of New York did not appear on the ballot in 2006.
 John Spencer (Republican) - former Mayor of Yonkers, New York (1995–2003). Prior to entering politics as a member of the Yonkers City Council in 1991, he worked in retail, food service, construction, waste management and banking. Spencer was also on the line of the Conservative Party of New York.

Minor 
 Bill Van Auken (Socialist Equality)- a full-time writer for the World Socialist Web Site and the 2004 Socialist Equality Party candidate for U.S. President.
 Roger Calero (Socialist Workers)- a writer for The Militant, associate editor of Perspective Mundial, and the 2004 Socialist Workers Party candidate for US President.
 Howie Hawkins (Green)- an American politician and activist. He co-founded the anti-nuclear Clamshell Alliance in 1976 and the Green Party in the United States in 1984.
 Boris Krymskiy (I) - an independent candidate according to some FEC filings, but he was not listed on the ballot or included in final results.
 Jeff Russell (Libertarian)- Russell's campaign slogan was "A Vote for Peace and Liberty is Never a Wasted Vote."
Lester "Beetlejuice" Green (Wack Pack)- Green made an announcement via video for the "2008 New York Senate Election," though there were no Senate elections in New York in 2008. The announcement video listed his stances on abortion and tax cuts. Green was not listed on any ballot.

Campaign 
Clinton spent $36 million for her re-election, more than any other candidate for Senate in the 2006 elections.

Polls during the campaign generally showed Clinton with a 20-point lead or better over Spencer, with none of the third-party candidates — Hawkins, Bill Van Auken of the Socialist Equality Party, and Jeff Russell of the Libertarian Party — showing strength.

On November 7, 2006, Clinton won easily, garnering 67% of the vote to Spencer's 31%.

Debates 
Complete video of debate, October 20, 2006
Complete video of debate, October 22, 2006

Predictions

Polling

Results 
Source: New York State Board of Elections General Election Results, Certified December 14, 2006

Percentages do not add to 100% due to rounding.
Per New York State law, Clinton and Spencer totals include their minor party line votes: Independence Party and Working Families Party for Clinton, Conservative Party for Spencer.
In addition, 213,777 ballots were blank, void, or scattered, and are not included in the Turnout sum or percentages.

Analysis 

Clinton's victory margin over her Republican opponent (67%–31%) was a significant gain over her showing in the 2000 senate race against Rick Lazio (55%–43%).  She carried all but four of New York's sixty-two counties. Clinton's 2006 margin did not quite equal the percentage received by Eliot Spitzer in the concurrent gubernatorial race (69%%–29%) nor by Charles Schumer in his 2004 Senate re-election campaign (71%%–24%), both of which had also been against little-known Republican opponents.

Jeanine Pirro would go on to get the Republican nomination for New York State Attorney General, but lost in the 2006 attorney general election to Democrat Andrew Cuomo.

Clinton was criticized by some Democrats for spending too much in a one-sided contest, while some supporters were concerned she did not leave more funds for a potential presidential bid in 2008. In the following months she transferred $10 million of her Senate funds toward her 2008 presidential campaign.

Following her Attorney General loss, Pirro left electoral politics and became a television judge and political commentator. Spencer left politics altogether. Tasani ran for a House seat in 2010 but was not competitive. Clinton fell short in her 2008 presidential nomination bid, served as U.S. Secretary of State for four years, and then ran again in the 2016 United States presidential election but suffered a general election loss. The candidate from this 2006 senate campaign whose officeholding instanced furthest into the future turned out to be McFarland, who in 2017 became U.S. Deputy National Security Advisor.

See also 
 2006 United States Senate elections
 2006 New York gubernatorial election

References

External links 
 New York Elections Website
 Sample New York State ballot

Candidate pages
 Hillary Clinton (D) for Senate 
 John Spencer (R) for Senate
 Howie Hawkins (G) for Senate
 Jeff Russell (L) for Senate

2006 New York (state) elections
2006
New York
Hillary Clinton